Ireland is one of one hundred countries that have submitted films for the Academy Award for Best International Feature Film. The award is handed out annually by the United States Academy of Motion Picture Arts and Sciences to a feature-length motion picture produced outside the United States that contains primarily non-English dialogue. Although Ireland has a thriving domestic film industry, most feature films are produced in English and are thus ineligible for the award. , nine Irish films have been submitted to the Academy for Oscar consideration with one (The Quiet Girl) being nominated. The Irish Film & Television Academy (IFTA) submits Ireland's entry.

Submissions
The Academy of Motion Picture Arts and Sciences has invited the film industries of various countries to submit their best film for the Academy Award for Best Foreign Language Film since 1956. The Foreign Language Film Award Committee oversees the process and reviews all the submitted films. Following this, they vote via secret ballot to determine the five nominees for the award. Below is a list of the films that have been submitted by Ireland for review by the Academy for the award by year and the respective Academy Awards ceremony.

See also
List of Academy Award winners and nominees for Best Foreign Language Film
List of Academy Award-winning foreign language films
List of Irish Academy Award winners and nominees
Cinema of Ireland

Notes

References

External links
The Official Academy Awards Database
The Motion Picture Credits Database
IMDb Academy Awards Page

Ireland
Academy Award